Putka (Jauja Quechua for "muddy", also spelled Putca) is a mountain in the Cordillera Central in the Andes of Peru, about  high. It is slocated in the Lima Region, Huarochirí Province, Chicla District.

References

Mountains of Peru
Mountains of Lima Region